Richard John "Rick" Sellers (born 8 March 1980) is an English cricketer. He is a right-handed batsman and a right-arm off-break bowler who played for Northumberland. He was born in Bolton, Greater Manchester.

Sellers, who played for Benwell Hill between 2000 and 2001, made a single List A appearance for Northumberland in 2001, against Staffordshire. From the lower order, he scored a single run.

External links
Rick Sellers at CricketArchive 

1980 births
Living people
English cricketers
Northumberland cricketers
Cricketers from Bolton